Sørum Church is a parish church of the Church of Norway in Gran Municipality in Innlandet county, Norway. It is located in the village of Bjoneroa. It is the church for the Bjoneroa parish which is part of the Hadeland og Land prosti (deanery) in the Diocese of Hamar. The white, wooden church was built in a long church design in 1861 using plans drawn up by the architect Jacob Wilhelm Nordan. The church seats about 220 people.

History
Planning for a new church in the Bjoneroa area began in the 1850s. Jacob Wilhelm Nordan was hired to make designs for the new church. The foundation stone was laid on 22 October 1860. It was a wooden long church. The timber was donated and the construction work was led by Lars Jacobsen Hvinden. The church was consecrated by the rector on 25 September 1861.

See also
List of churches in Hamar

References

Gran, Norway
Churches in Innlandet
Long churches in Norway
Wooden churches in Norway
19th-century Church of Norway church buildings
Churches completed in 1861
1861 establishments in Norway